Royal warrants of appointment in Denmark are historically differentiated between purveyors to the king or queen (Danish: Kongelig Hofleverandør) and purveyors to the royal Danish court (Leverandør til Det Kongelige Danske Hof).

Purveyors
There are approximately 100 purveyors to the Danish Court, including:

 A. Dragsted
 A. Michelsen
 A.C. Perch's Thehandel
 Albani Bryggerierne A/S
 Anker Kysters Eftf.
 Anthon Berg A/S
 ASP-Holmblad A/S
 Bang & Olufsen A/S
 Beauvais
 Bering House of Flowers
 Bing & Grøndahl
 Birger Christensen A/S
 Bisca A/S
 Bon Gout
 Bornholms Konservesfabrik A/S
 C.E. Fritzsche
 C.L. Seifert A/S
 Carl Petersens Blomsterhandel
 Carlsberg A/S
 Castrol A/S
 Celli Freifeldt
 Ceres Bryggerierne A/S
 Co'libri
 Danæg
 Dansukker
 De Danske Spritfabrikker
 Deerhunter
 Den Kongelige Porcelainsfabrik A/S
 ECCO Sko A/S
 egetæpper a/s
 Egmont Holding A/S
 F. Bülow & Co.
 Ford Motor Company A/S
 Galle & Jessen A/S
 Georg Bestle A/S
 Georg Jensen Damask
 Georg Jensen A/S
 Glyngøre Limfjord A/S
 Grundfos
 H. Carstensen Malerforretning
 Hannibal Sander A/S
 Harboes Bryggeri A/S
 Holger Clausens Bolighus
 Holmegaards Glasværker
 Høng Skimmeloste
 IBM Danmark A/S
 Illums Bolighus
 J.C. Hempel's Skibsfarve-Fabrik A/S
 Jacob Kongsbak Lassen
 Jean-Leonard
 Jysk
 Kay Bojesen A/S
 Kelsen Group A/S
 Kjær & Sommerfeldt A/S
 Kongens Bryghus A/S
 Kristian F. Møller
 L & S Signal Textiles A/S
 Lauritz Knudsen A/S
 Le Klint A/S
 LEGO A/S
 Limfjords Østers Kompagniet A/S
 LINDBERG A/S
 M.W. Mørch & Søns Eftf.
 Magasin du Nord
 Morsø Jernstøberi A/S
 Munke Mølle A/S
 Nybo Jensen Konfektion A/S
 Odense Marcipan A/S
 Ole Lynggaard Copenhagen
 Ole Mathiesen A/S
 Oluf Brønnum & Co. A/S
 Peter F. Heering A/S
 P. Hertz
 Peter Justesen Company A/S
 Poulsen Roser A/S
 Raadvad A/S
 Randers Handskefabrik
 Royal Copenhagen
 Royal Greenland A/S
 S. Dyrup & Co A/S
 Schous Beslagsmedie
 Skælskør Frugtplantage A/S
 Skandinavisk Motor Co. A/S
 Sømods Bolcher
 Statoil A/S
 Steff-Houlberg
 Sv. Michelsen Chokolade A/S
 Tapet-Café
 TDC Tele Danmark
 Thiele
 Thor Bryggerierne A/S
 Toms Fabrikker A/S
 Tørsleff & Co. A/S
 Trianon
 Tuborgs Bryggerier A/S
 Tulip Food Company
 Volvo Personvogne Danmark A/S
 Warre's Port Wine
 Wiibroes Bryggeri A/S
 Xerox A/S
 Århus Possementfabrik A/S

References

Bibliography

External links
By Appointment to The Royal Danish Court